Gerania bosci is an Asian species of flat-faced longhorn beetle in the subfamily Lamiinae. It is the only species in the genus Gerania (Audinet-Serville, 1835).

Description
The body coloration is quite variable. Usually the background ranges from bright yellow to almost white, with large brown or black spots and markings and bluish-black legs. This species has unusually long legs, almost spider-like, making it distinctive, and popular among collectors. The males are larger than females and have elongated appendages.

Distribution and habitat
This species can be found in mixed forests of India, Myanmar, Laos, Thailand, Vietnam, Malaysia, Cambodia and Indonesia (Sumatra, Java, Bali, Lombok, Timor).

References
 Biolib
 Worldwide Cerambycoidea Photo Gallery

External links
 What is that bug

Lamiini
Beetles described in 1801